Manganello is a surname. Notable people with the surname include:

Jim Manganello (born 1976), American soccer player
Mike Manganello (born 1941), American jockey
Timothy M. Manganello (born 1950), American businessman

See also
Joe Manganiello (born 1976), American actor

Surnames of Italian origin